Fokker D.XVII (sometimes written as Fokker D.17), was a 1930s Dutch sesquiplane developed by Fokker. It was the last fabric-covered biplane fighter they developed in a lineage that extended back to the First World War Fokker D.VII.

Design and development
Problems with severe vibration in the Armstrong Siddeley Jaguar radial engine on the Fokker D.XVI resulted in one being converted to use a normally aspirated  Curtiss Conqueror V-1570 V-twelve, becoming the prototype for the D.XVII. 
Production versions were fitted with a  Rolls-Royce Kestrel, while one aircraft was built with a  Lorraine Pétrel and another was built with a  Hispano-Suiza 12Xbrs for comparison purposes. 
Structure was standard for Fokkers throughout the 1920s. The sesquiplane's fuselage was welded steel tube with fabric covering and the wings were made with wood spars and ribs covered with plywood.

Operational history
On 18 January 1935, Lieutenant René Wittert van Hoogland set a Dutch high-altitude record in a Fokker D.XVII of  while using oxygen and high octane fuel.

By May 1939, the aircraft was obsolete and remaining examples were transferred to the LVA Flying School for fighter pilot training however they saw some action during the Battle of the Netherlands, escorting Fokker C.Vs and C.Xs on bombing missions.
When the Netherlands surrendered to the Germans, all surviving aircraft were burnt.

Airspeed Ltd. had a licence to build Fokker aircraft in England and considered making the Fokker D.XVII fighter for Greece under the designation Airspeed AS.17. Greek government interest was constrained by currency concerns. Neville Shute and a Fokker representative "who was well accustomed to methods of business in the Balkans" spent three weeks in Athens but they did not close the deal.

Operators

Royal Netherlands Air Force
Royal Netherlands East Indies Army - one example

Specifications (Fokker D.XVII)

See also

References

Citations

Bibliography

1930s Dutch fighter aircraft
D 17
Aircraft first flown in 1932
Sesquiplanes